The Château de Turenne is a ruined castle in Turenne, Corrèze département of France. It is a listed monument.

See also
List of castles in France

References

External links
Château de Turenne 

Ruined castles in Nouvelle-Aquitaine
Gardens in Corrèze